Events from the year 1874 in Sweden

Incumbents
 Monarch – Oscar II

Events

 27 April – Hildegard Björck becomes the first Swedish woman to complete an academic degree.
 In accordance with the recommendations of the progressive Girls' School Committee of 1866, girls' schools which meet the demands are given governmental support.
 In accordance with the Girls' School Committee of 1866, Wallinska skolan becomes the first girls' school permitted to administer the studentexamen for its students. 
 Married women granted control over their own income.
 The inauguration of the Grand Hôtel (Stockholm). 
 Foundation of the Långholmen Prison
 Maria Stenkula opens the Malmö högre läroverk för flickor
 Establishment of the Prästerskapets Änke- och Pupillkassa, a retirement fund for widows of priests.
 Foundation of the Swedish Publicists' Association.
 Foundation of the Friends of Handicraft.

Births

 11 February – Elsa Beskow, author and illustrator (died 1954)
 13 February – Elsa Lindberg, Swedish writer and princess of Persia (died 1944)
 5 July – Anna Lang, harpist (died 1920)

Deaths

 11 February – Zelma Hedin, stage actress (born 1827)      
 23 March – Gertrud Ahlgren, cunning woman and natural healer (born 1782)
 21 June – Anders Jonas Ångström physicist and one of the founders of the science of spectroscopy (born 1814)
 6 November – Anders Selinder, ballet master  (born 1806)

References

 
Years of the 19th century in Sweden
Sweden